Lekapenos or Lakapenos (Λακαπηνός), usually Latinized as Lecapenus, feminine form Lekapene (Λεκαπηνή), was the name of a prominent, assumed, Byzantine-Armenian family of humble background which intermarried with and almost managed to usurp the throne from the Macedonian dynasty in the first half of the 10th century.

The family was founded by Theophylact, surnamed Abaktistos or Abastaktos, an allegedly Armenian peasant who saved the life of Emperor Basil I the Macedonian in 872 and received estates as a reward. The family surname derives from the locality of Lakape; possibly these estates were located there. Theophylact's son Romanos became commander-in-chief of the Imperial Fleet and eventually senior emperor in 920 after marrying his daughter Helena to the legitimate emperor Constantine VII, grandson of Basil I. He raised three of his sons, Christopher, Stephen, and Constantine, as co-emperors alongside Constantine VII. Another son, Theophylact, was made Patriarch of Constantinople, and Christopher's daughter Maria-Irene was married to the Tsar Peter I of Bulgaria. Romanos was deposed by Stephen and Constantine in December 944, but they too were in turn soon deposed and Constantine VII was restored as sole emperor. Their descendants continued to occupy senior palace offices in the next decades, but the most notable member of the family was Romanos' illegitimate son Basil Lekapenos, who as the imperial parakoimomenos was the virtual ruler of the empire until the 980s. 

The family is barely attested thereafter; only a certain Constantine Lekapenos is known through his seal for the entirety of the 11th century, and the last important member was George Lakapenos, a 14th-century official and writer.

List of rulers 
Romanos I Lekapenos (Ρωμανός A') (870–948, ruled 919–944) – father-in-law of Constantine VII; co-emperor, attempted to found his own dynasty. Deposed by his sons and entered monastery.
Christopher Lekapenos (ruled 921–931) – son of Romanos I; co-emperor
Stephen Lekapenos (ruled 924–945) – son of Romanos I; co-emperor
Constantine Lekapenos (ruled 924–945) – son of Romanos I; co-emperor

Matrilineal descent 
Romanos II the Purple-born (Ρωμανός Β') (938–963, ruled 959–963) – son of Constantine VII and Helena Lekapene
Basil II (Βασίλειος Β') the Bulgar-slayer (958–1025, ruled 976–1025) – son of Romanos II
Constantine VIII (Κωνσταντῖνος Η') (960-1028, ruled 1025–1028) – son of Romanos II; silent co-emperor with Basil II, sole emperor after his brother's death
Zoë Porphyrogenita (Ζωή) (c. 978–1050, ruled 1028–1050) – daughter of Constantine VIII
Theodora Porphyrogenita (Θεοδώρα) (980–1056, ruled 1042) – daughter of Constantine VIII, co-empress with Zoe

Family tree
After Steven Runciman, The Emperor Romanus Lecapenus and His Reign: A Study of Tenth-Century Byzantium, Appendix IV:

See also
 History of the Byzantine Empire
 Byzantine Empire under the Macedonian dynasty

References

Sources